Commander of the Navy may refer to:

Commander of the Navy (Israel)
Commander of the Navy (Romania)
Commander of the Navy (Sri Lanka)
Commander of the Navy (Taiwan)
Commander of the Navy (Ukraine)